Joe Williams may refer to:

Music
Big Joe Williams (1903–1982), Delta blues singer
Joe Williams (jazz singer) (1918–1999), American jazz singer

Sports

Association football
 Joe Williams (footballer, born 1873), English footballer
 Joe Williams (footballer, born 1996), English footballer
 Joe Williams (Irish footballer) (1907–1987)

Gridiron football
 Joe Williams (back) (1915–1997), American football player
 Joe Williams (guard) (1896–1949), American football guard for the Canton Bulldogs and the New York Giants
 Joe Williams (defensive end) (born 1942), American football defensive end in Canada
 Joe Williams (fullback) (1941–2015), American football player in Canada
 Joe Williams (linebacker) (born 1965), American football linebacker
 Joe Williams (running back, born 1947), American football running back
 Joe Williams (running back, born 1993), American football running back

Other sports
 Smokey Joe Williams (1886–1951), Negro leagues baseball pitcher
 Joe Williams (basketball) (c.1934–2022), American basketball coach at Jacksonville, Furman, and Florida State universities
 Joe Williams (wrestler) (born 1974), American amateur freestyle wrestler
 Joe Williams (rugby league) (born 1983), Australian rugby league player for the Bulldogs National Rugby League team
 Joe Williams (fighter) (born 1985), American mixed martial artist

Other
Joe Williams (trade unionist) (1871–1929), British trade union leader
Joe Williams (Cook Islands politician) (1934–2020), medical doctor and Prime Minister of the Cook Islands
Joe Williams (film critic) (1958–2015), critic for the St. Louis Post-Dispatch
Joe Williams (judge) (born 1961), New Zealand jurist
Joe Williams (game developer) (born 1965), software developer

See also
Jo Williams (born 1948), executive at MENCAP
Jo Williams (speed skater) (born 1981), British speed skater
Joel Williams (disambiguation)
Joey Williams (1902–1978), English former footballer
Joseph Williams (disambiguation)